Condingup is a town in the Goldfields–Esperance region of Western Australia, in the Shire of Esperance local government area,  southeast of the state capital, Perth. At the 2016 census, it and the surrounding region had a population of 278.

Condingup was declared a townsite on 3 May 1963. Its name is thought to be derived from the Aboriginal word Kunjinup, a local wildflower. Local industries includes cattle, sheep and grain production.

From the 1950s to the 1970s a range of celebrities owned property in the area including Art Linkletter, Anne Baxter and Rhonda Fleming. Linkletter helped the town establish its first school, school bus and shop.

References

External links
Community website

Towns in Western Australia
Shire of Esperance